Jitendra Satish Awhad is a Indian politician from Maharashtra. He was a Member of the Legislative Assembly of Maharashtra for 3 terms representing Mumbra-Kalwa in Thane. He has previously served as Cabinet Minister of Medical Education and Horticulture in 2014 and Housing and Minority Affairs from 2019 to 2022. He also served as the Guardian Minister of Solapur from 2020. He belongs to the Nationalist Congress Party.

Early life and education

Jitendra Awhad was born to Smt. Lilavati and Shri Satish Awhad. He went to St. John the Baptist High School, Thane. In 1981 he enrolled in B.N Bandodkar College as a science graduate. While in college, he was chosen as Gymkhana Secretary, and further went on to become the secretary of the All-India Students' Organization, a non-political outfit. Awhad started standing up for social causes early on launching a campaign against rising tuition fees in Mumbai University in 1982. After completing his Marine Engineering Studies in 1984-85, he undertook a post graduate degree in personnel management from Mumbai University. Awhad also holds a Doctorate from Mumbai University, the thesis being "The History of Socio-Religious Movement in Maharashtra, a Sub-Alternate View".
 
Awhad was greatly influenced by Sharad Pawar during his university days and considered him as his mentor. He joined the students’ wing of the Indian National Congress and held positions such as Chief Secretary & General Secretary in the Maharashtra unit while being the President of the Akhil Bhartiya Vanjara Youth Association. In 1988 he became the Maharashtra Pradesh National Students' Union of India (NSUI) Chief Secretary, following that he was appointed the General Secretary of all India NSUI in 1991. Along with his involvement in politics, he worked in Kores India Limited, Thane as Asst. Labour Officer from 1988 to 1995. In 1996 Awhad was appointed the Maharashtra Pradesh Youth Congress President.

Formation of Nationalist Congress Party

In 1999, after the 12th Lok Sabha was dissolved and elections to the 13th Lok Sabha were called, Sharad Pawar, P. A. Sangma, and Tariq Anwar demanded that the party needed to propose someone native-born as the prime ministerial candidate and not the Italian-born Sonia Gandhi, who had entered party politics and replaced Sitaram Kesri as Congress president. In response, the Congress Working Committee (CWC) expelled the trio for six years from the party.

In response Pawar and Sangma founded the Nationalist Congress Party in June 1999. Despite the falling out, the new party aligned with the Congress party to form a coalition government in Maharashtra after the 1999 Maharashtra Legislative Assembly election to prevent the Shiv Sena-BJP combine from returning to power.

In politics

After the formation of the Nationalist Congress Party (NCP), Awhad was elected as the first National President of Youth NCP in 1999. From here he entered mainstream politics and was elected as MLC in 2002. He was re-elected as an MLC in March 2008 for a five-year term. In 2009 he contested his first ever elections and secured victory with a considerable margin from the Mumbra-Kalwa (Vidhan Sabha constituency).

In May 2014 he was inducted into the Prithviraj Chavan ministry as the Minister of Medical Education, Horticulture, Employment Guarantee. As Minister of Horticulture of Maharashtra state, Dr. Jitendra Awhad gained popularity when he proposed Amitabh Bachchan's name for being the brand ambassador for the state horticulture; encourage farmers, promote their produce and ensure quality for consumers. In July 2014 Amitabh Bachchan was appointed as Maharashtra's horticulture brand ambassador.

Dr. Jitendra Awhad started an initiative called “Coffee with Students” to connect and resolve issues of medical students across the state. In the first month alone, cities like Mumbai, Thane, Pune, Aurangabad, Kolhapur, Nagpur, Dhule, Solapur have been covered and effective measures have been taken to improve the situations for students and staff.

In 2019 he was inducted into the Thackeray ministry as the Minister of Housing. In March 2022 after the departure of Nawab Malik from the cabinet, Awhad was appointed as the Minister of Minority Development & Aukaf.

Personal life and activities

Awhad belongs to Vanjari caste and he follows Hinduism; he is married to Ruta Samant, the daughter of Dutta Samant, trade union leader, who is famous for leading 200–300 textile mill workers in the city of Bombay on a year-long strike in 1982 triggering the closure of most of the textile mills in the city. They have one daughter, Natasha Awhad. 

He is credited with popularizing and organizing the festival of Krishna Janmashtami or Dahi Handi, through his NGO Sangharsh. Every year lakhs of people visit the festival, especially groups of youth from Thane, Mumbai and Navi Mumbai to participate in the festival by forming human pyramids and winning huge prizes. He has also managed to invite Human Pyramid groups from Spain for this festival and has created world records for the highest pyramids of 9 layers.

References

Maharashtra MLAs 2009–2014
Maharashtra MLAs 2014–2019
Maharashtra MLAs 2019–2024
Nationalist Congress Party politicians from Maharashtra
Marathi people
Living people
1965 births